Jean Spencer may refer to:
 Jean Spencer (gymnast) (born 1940), New Zealand Olympic gymnast
 Jean Spencer (artist) (1942–1998), British artist

See also
 Jean Spencer Ashbrook